The Poznań Open is a professional tennis tournament played on outdoor red clay courts. It is currently part of the Association of Tennis Professionals (ATP) Challenger Tour. It has been held annually at the Park Tenisowy Olimpia in Poznań, Poland, since 2004.

The tournament is regarded as a continuation of Polish Open, which was held in Poznań for nine consecutive years between 1992 and 2000.

Naming
 
Since the incorporation of the tournament for seven consecutive editions – until 2010 it has been known as the Poznań Porsche Open and the following year as Poznań Porsche Open powered by Enea due to sponsorship reasons. Since 2012 the only major sponsor of the tournament is the City of Poznań, so it was then renamed the Poznań Open.

Past finals

Singles

Doubles

External links

ITF Search

 
ATP Challenger Tour
Clay court tennis tournaments
Tennis tournaments in Poland
Sport in Poznań
Recurring sporting events established in 2004